Events in the year 1940 in Turkey.

Parliament
 6th Parliament of Turkey

Incumbents
President – İsmet İnönü 
Prime Minister – Refik Saydam

Ruling party and the main opposition
  Ruling party – Republican People's Party (CHP)

Cabinet
12th government of Turkey

Events
18 January – Law of national prevention (Milli Korunma Kanunu) a law which authorizes the government to control the economy to overcome the war time hardships
17 April – The law of Village Institutes
29 June – Turco German trade agreement
20 October – Census (Population17,820,950)
25 November – Martial law in the European part of Turkey
20 December – Earthquake in the East Anatolia

Births
1 January – Alp Yalman, businessman
23 January – Dinç Bilgin, businessman, media owner
27 January – Ahmet Kurtcebe Alptemoçin, government minister
15 February – İsmail Cem İpekçi, government minister
23 February – Kamer Genç, politician
10 July – Rıfat Çalışkan, cyclist
29 July – Aytaç Yalman, general
1 September – Yaşar Büyükanıt, chief of staff
6 September – Mesut Yılmaz, prime minister (48th, 53rd and 55th government of Turkey)
18 October – Onur Öymen, politician, diplomat
20 November – Ediz Hun, actor

Deaths
19 March – Besim Ömer Akalın (born in 1862), MD and politician
18 April – Lütfi Müfit Özdeş (born in 1874), military officer
13 October – Muhittin Akyüz (born in 1879), military officer, diplomat and politician

Gallery

References

 
Years of the 20th century in Turkey